Waitkera is a genus of spiders in the family Uloboridae. It was first described in 1979 by Opell. , it contains only one species, Waitkera waitakerensis, found in New Zealand.



Description 
Female Waitkera waitakerensis are 3-5mm in length whereas males are 3-4mm in length. The female may weigh about 9 mg. The carapace is grey with light lateral margins. The dorsal side of the abdomen is white with five to six posteromedian grey chevrons whilst the ventral side is grey with white book lung covers. There may also be three pairs of white spots above the cribellum. There is also a Northland ecotype that occupies different habitat and is larger than the rest of W. waitakerensis.

Distribution/Habitat
Waitkera waitakerensis is restricted to the North Island of New Zealand. This species is the only member of the family Uloboridae endemic to New Zealand. The species is typically found in forests where horizontal orb-webs are constructed in understory vegetation. The Northland ecotype lives in shaded rock crevices of cliffs.

References

Uloboridae
Monotypic Araneomorphae genera
Spiders of New Zealand